Gregory Goodwin Pincus (April 9, 1903 – August 22, 1967) was an American biologist and researcher who co-invented the combined oral contraceptive pill.

Early life
Gregory Goodwin Pincus was born in Woodbine, New Jersey to Jewish parents, who were immigrants from the Russian Empire. His father was Joseph Pincus, a teacher and the editor of a farm journal, and his mother was Elizabeth (née Lipman), whose family had come from the region that is now Latvia. He credited two uncles, both agricultural scientists, for his interest in research. His IQ was said to be 210 and his family considered him a genius.

Pincus attended Cornell University and received a bachelor's degree in biology in 1924. He attended Harvard University, where he was an instructor in zoology while also working toward his master's and doctorate degrees. From 1927 to 1930 he moved from Harvard to Cambridge University in England to the Kaiser Wilhelm Institute for Biology with Richard Goldschmidt in Berlin where he performed research. He became an instructor in general physiology at Harvard University in 1930 and was promoted in 1931 to an assistant professor.

Research

Dr. Pincus began studying hormonal biology and steroidal hormones early in his career. He was interested in the way that hormones affected mammals' reproductive systems.  His first breakthrough came early, when he was able to produce in vitro fertilization in rabbits in 1934. In 1936, he published his discoveries after his experiments.  His experiments involving parthenogenesis produced a rabbit that appeared on the cover of Look magazine
in 1937. To create the in vitro rabbit baby, Pincus removed the ovum from the mother rabbit and placed it in a solution mixture of saline and estrone.  Afterwards, he placed the "fertilized" ovum back into the rabbit.  Pincus' experiment became known as "Pincogenesis" because other scientists were unable to attain the same results when conducting the experiment. After he was misquoted in an interview, it was believed that his experiment was the beginning of the use of in vitro for humans.

In 1944, Dr. Pincus co-founded the Worcester Foundation for Experimental Biology in Shrewsbury, Massachusetts.  He wanted to continue his research of the relationship between hormones and diseases such as, but not limited to, cancer, heart disease, and schizophrenia.  By the end of the 1960s, more than 300 international researchers came to participate in the Worcester Foundation of Experimental Biology.

Pincus never lost interest in mammals' reproduction systems.  He began to research infertility.  In 1951, Margaret Sanger met Pincus at a dinner hosted by Abraham Stone, director of the Margaret Sanger Research Bureau and medical director and vice president of Planned Parenthood Federation of America (PPFA), and procured a small grant from PPFA for Pincus to begin hormonal contraceptive research.  Pincus, along with Min Chueh Chang, confirmed earlier research that progesterone would act as an inhibitor to ovulation.

In 1952, Sanger told her friend Katharine McCormick about Pincus and Chang's research. Frustrated by PPFA's meager interest and support, McCormick and Sanger met with Pincus in 1953 to dramatically expand the scope of the research with 50-fold increase in funding from McCormick. Pincus was fascinated by Sanger because she revealed what life was like for women who were living in poverty who endured many pregnancies.  Sanger indirectly influenced him to create a successful contraceptive to prevent unwanted pregnancies.

In order to prove the safety of "the pill," human trials had to be conducted. These were initiated on infertility patients of Dr. John Rock in Brookline, Massachusetts using progesterone in 1953 and then three different progestins in 1954. Puerto Rico was selected as a trial site in 1955, in part because there was an existing network of 67 birth control clinics serving low-income women on the island. Trials began there in 1956 and were supervised by Dr. Edris Rice-Wray and Celso-Ramón García.

Some of the women experienced side effects from "the pill" (Enovid) and Edris Rice-Wray wrote Pincus and reported that Enovid "gives one hundred percent protection against pregnancy [but causes] too many side reactions to be acceptable". Pincus and Rock disagreed based on their experience with patients in Massachusetts and conducted research showing that placebos caused similar side effects. The trials went on and were expanded to Haiti, Mexico and Los Angeles despite high attrition rates, due to the large number of women eager to try this form of contraception.

In May 1960, the FDA extended Enovid's approved indications to include contraception.

Personal life

Pincus married Elizabeth Notkin (1900–1988) in 1924 and they had three children together.

Awards
Pincus was the recipient of numerous awards.  Some of these awards include the Oliver Bird Prize in 1960, the Julius A. Koch Award in 1962, the Cameron Prize for Therapeutics of the University of Edinburgh in 1966, and the American Medical Association's Scientific Achievement Award in 1967.  Pincus was acknowledged for his creation of the Laurentian Hormone Conference, which was a conference of endocrinologists.  Pincus served as the chairman of the conference and its purpose was to discuss the hormones of the endocrine system.  The conference was attended by endocrinologists from all over the world.

Death
He died in 1967 of myeloid metaplasia, a rare blood disease, in Boston, Massachusetts. He was 64 years old and lived in Northborough, Massachusetts. His funeral was held August 25, 1967 at Temple Emanuel in Worcester, Massachusetts.

Lasting impact

Pincus' birth control pill changed family life in a significant way, because it allowed women to choose—for the first time—when they would have children and plan accordingly around this decision in a deliberate manner. The birth control pill helped pave the way for the women's liberation and concomitant Sexual Revolution movements.

See also
 Birth control movement in the United States

References

Further reading
 
 
 

Weintraub, B. Pincus, Djerassi and Oral Contraceptives. Chemistry in Israel, Bulletin of the Israel Chemical Society. August 2005.

External links
 

1903 births
1967 deaths
People from Woodbine, New Jersey
American people of Latvian-Jewish descent
American people of Russian-Jewish descent
Jewish American scientists
American biochemists
Cornell University College of Agriculture and Life Sciences alumni
Harvard University alumni
Harvard University faculty
Clark University faculty
People from Northborough, Massachusetts
20th-century American Jews